The 2001 Open Gatz de France Singles was the singles portion of the 2001 Open Gaz de France. Nathalie Tauziat was the defending champion but lost in the semifinals to Amélie Mauresmo.

Mauresmo won in the final 7–6(7–2), 6–1 against Anke Huber.

Seeds
A champion seed is indicated in bold text while text in italics indicates the round in which that seed was eliminated. The top four seeds received a bye to the second round.

  Mary Pierce (second round)
  Anna Kournikova (quarterfinals)
  Nathalie Tauziat (semifinals)
  Elena Dementieva (second round)
  Sandrine Testud (first round)
  Anke Huber (final)
  Amy Frazier (quarterfinals)
  Amélie Mauresmo (champion)

Draw

Final

Top half

Bottom half

References
 2001 Open Gaz de France Draw

Open GDF Suez
2001 WTA Tour